William Tanner is a fictional character in the James Bond film and novel series. Tanner is an employee of the Secret Intelligence Service (MI6) who acts as M's chief of staff.

Novels
In Ian Fleming's novels, Bill Tanner is MI6's chief of staff. He appears infrequently in the novels, but is a regular character in the later continuation series by John Gardner.

In 1965, Kingsley Amis wrote The Book of Bond or Every Man His Own 007, a tongue-in-cheek manual for prospective secret agents, illustrated with examples from Fleming's novels. For this work, Amis used the pseudonym "Lt. Colonel William ('Bill') Tanner".

Film appearances

In The Man with the Golden Gun, Bill Tanner is only seen briefly in the film and is not mentioned by name until the end credits. He appears in M's office with M and Colthorpe, discussing Francisco Scaramanga, who has sent a bullet to MI6 printed with Bond's ID number. He explains Scaramanga's fingerprints on the bullet were verified by the CIA, and that Scaramanga is attempting to provoke a battle with MI6. This leads to Bond being sent to find Scaramanga.

In For Your Eyes Only, Bill Tanner (now played by James Villiers due to Michael Goodliffe's death in 1976) is given a bigger role, as Bernard Lee, who played M, had died. Tanner is shown wearing an Old Wykehamist tie. He gives Bond his assignment (along with Sir Fredrick Gray), which sends him to find Hector Gonzales. Bond is unable to get information from Gonzales later on because Melina Havelock kills him after Bond is captured. Tanner then gets upset at him for not getting any information and letting Melina murder him. Tanner is last seen at the end of the film, when he connects the Prime Minister and Bond by phone. Unknowingly though, Bond is not there and it is merely a talking parrot that ends up "flirting" with the Prime Minister. In Octopussy, the role of M was recast with Robert Brown, so Tanner did not appear.

In GoldenEye, Tanner is only briefly seen in the Situation Room when the GoldenEye weapon is set off. Tanner calls the new M, "the Evil Queen of Numbers," unaware that she is right behind him. As Michael Kitchen was unable to reprise his role for Tomorrow Never Dies, the character of Charles Robinson, was created in his stead.

In The World Is Not Enough, Tanner is seen at the Scotland MI6 building debriefing the agents on the murder of Sir Robert King, father of Elektra King.  When Bond comes to the conclusion that the terrorist Renard is behind it, Tanner is seen with them talking about what Renard can do or is planning to do. He is only seen again twice, when Elektra, the true mastermind of her father's murder, contacts M to draw her in to be kidnapped, and finally at the end of the film as R is attempting to find Bond.

Tanner had never been considered a regular cinematic character until 2008's Quantum of Solace. He was played by a different actor, Rory Kinnear, giving Judi Dench (who played M) the distinction of having played opposite two different actors playing the role of Tanner. Kinnear is also the godson of Dench's late husband Michael Williams. Kinnear reprised the role of Tanner in Skyfall, Spectre, and No Time to Die. Kinnear also voices Tanner and provides his likeness for the 2010 remake of the GoldenEye game and the original games James Bond 007: Blood Stone and 007 Legends.

References

James Bond characters
Characters in British novels of the 20th century
Literary characters introduced in 1953
Fictional Australian people
Fictional Chiefs of Staff
Fictional SIS agents